Hey Man is the fourth studio album by the hard rock band, Mr. Big. It would be their last album with guitarist Paul Gilbert until 2011's What If.... The album was the most successful Mr. Big release in Japan, topping the Japanese Oricon chart, where it remained for 16 weeks.

Track listing

Personnel
Mr. Big
Eric Martin – lead vocals
Paul Gilbert – guitar
Billy Sheehan – bass guitar
Pat Torpey – drums

Production
Kevin Elson – producer, engineer, mixing
Tom Size – engineer, mixing
John Novello, Michael Rosen, Shawn Berman – assistant engineers
Bob Ludwig – mastering

Charts

Certifications

References

External links
Heavy Harmonies page

1996 albums
Mr. Big (American band) albums
Atlantic Records albums
Albums produced by Kevin Elson